Ustad Shafaat Ahmed Khan (20 May 1954 – 24 July 2005) New Delhi, India, was one of the leading tabla maestros in the field of Hindustani classical music.

Shafaat Ahmed Khan came from the "Dilli Gharana" (Delhi gharana) and was the son and disciple of tabla maestro Chhamma Khan who was a prominent exponent of the Dilli Gharana. Shafaat Ahmed Khan was famous for his mastery over clear 'bols' and melodious tone of the tabla, accompaniment (sangat) and systematic improvisation. During his active years he was one of the leading tabla maestros of India. Shafaat Ahmed Khan was a recipient of "Padma Shree" award in 2003. 

He performed concerts all around the world with classical artistes like  Ravi Shankar, Nikhil Banerjee, Shivkumar Sharma, Amjad Ali Khan, Bhimsen Joshi, Jasraj, Hari Prasad Chaurasia, Kishori Amonkar, Birju Maharaj, besides performances as solo artist. Shafaat Ahmed Khan also played various taal vadya kacheris and jugalbandis with carnatic artists like Vikku Vinayakram, Lalgudi Jayaraman, Balamurali Krishna, Vellore Ramabhadran, Sivamani, Shankar Mahadevan and others, internationally. Shafaat Ahmed Khan was popular among artists because of his humble nature and down to earth attitude.

Awards and recognition
Shafaat Ahmed Khan was a recipient of the fourth highest Indian civilian award, "Padma Shri" in 2003.

Death
He died at age 51 on 24 July 2005 after being diagnosed with acute Hepatitis-B.

References

External links
Delhi School Of Music (tabla players) Outlook (magazine)

1954 births
2005 deaths
Tabla players
Indian percussionists
People from New Delhi
20th-century Indian musicians
20th-century drummers
Recipients of the Padma Shri in arts